This is a list of streets and roads in Lahore, Punjab, Pakistan.

Names of road after 
 Abbot road named after Sir James Abbott, Pakistani city Abbottabad also named after him.
 Chamberlain road named after a soldier Chamberlain
 Nicholson road named after a soldier Nicholson
 Beadon road name after Commissioner or Deputy Commissioner Beadon  
 Brandreth road name after Commissioner or Deputy Commissioner Brandreth 
 Cooper road name after Commissioner or Deputy Commissioner Mr. Cooper
 Cust road name after Commissioner or Deputy Commissioner Cust
 lake road name after Commissioner or Deputy Commissioner lake
 Hall road name after Commissioner or Deputy Commissioner Hall
 Nisbet road name after Commissioner or Deputy Commissioner Col. Perry Nisbet
 Durand road named after former Lt. Governor.
 Davies road named after former Lt. Governor.
 Mcleod road named after former Lt. Governor.
 Egerton road named after former Lt. Governor.
 Montgomery road named after former Lt. Governor.
 Maclagan road named after Major Gen. Maclagan
 Temple road named after Sir Richard temple,Bart (later he became governor of Bombay)
 Thornton road named after civil servant
 Roberts road name after Judicial Commissioner A.A.Roberts
 Edwardes road named after Herbert Edwardes
 Napier road named after R. Napier
 Lawrence named after former Governor General or Viceroy.  
 Mayo named after former Governor General or Viceroy.
 Lytton named after former Governor General or Viceroy.

Current and old names

See also 
 Transport in Lahore
 Transport in Pakistan
 List of bus routes in Lahore

Reference

 
Bus routes in Lahore
Lahore
Lahore-related lists